Olga Khokhlova (Russian: Ольга Николаевна Хохлова; born 18 November 1957) is a Russian politician serving as a senator from the Legislative Assembly of Vladimir Oblast since 5 October 2018.

Olga Khokhlova is under personal sanctions introduced by the European Union, the United Kingdom, the USA, Canada, Switzerland, Australia, Ukraine, New Zealand, for ratifying the decisions of the "Treaty of Friendship, Cooperation and Mutual Assistance between the Russian Federation and the Donetsk People's Republic and between the Russian Federation and the Luhansk People's Republic" and providing political and economic support for Russia's annexation of Ukrainian territories.

Biography

Olga Khokhlova was born on 18 November 1957 in Murom, Vladimir Oblast. In 1983, she graduated from Vladimir State University for the Humanities. In 1993, she received a degree from the Academy of Labour and Social Relations. Starting from the beginning of the 1980s, she worked as a primary school teacher. From 2000 to 2002, she was the head of the organizational department at the Vladimir branch of the Unity party. On 1 March 2009, Khokhlova was elected deputy of the Legislative Assembly of Vladimir Oblast of the 5th convocation. From 2009 to 2019, she was the Deputy Chairman of the Legislative Assembly. On 5 October 2018, she became the senator from the Legislative Assembly of Vladimir Oblast.

Other
As of 2021, Khokhlova's annual income amounted to 5,86 million rubles. She declared that she owned two apartments, one house, a 7000-square meters piece of land, and a car.

References

Living people
1957 births
United Russia politicians
21st-century Russian politicians
People from Murom
Members of the Federation Council of Russia (after 2000)